is a railway station on the AbukumaExpress in the city of Date, Fukushima Japan. It was opened July 1, 1988.

Lines

Station layout
Hobara Station has a single island platform. The station is staffed.

Inside, there is a large waiting room and a shop selling local products and goods related to Date City's promotional anime Masamune Date ni Kuru.

Adjacent stations

History
Hobara Station opened on July 1, 1988.

In 2002, it was chosen to be one of 100 stations representing the Tōhoku region.

Passenger statistics
In fiscal 2015, the station was used by an average of 544 passengers daily (boarding passengers only).

Surrounding area
Hobara Post Office

See also
 List of Railway Stations in Japan

External links

  Abukuma Express home page

References

Railway stations in Fukushima Prefecture
Abukuma Express Line
Railway stations in Japan opened in 1988
Date, Fukushima